The Cactus Kid is a Mickey Mouse short animated film first released on May 10, 1930, as part of the Mickey Mouse film series. It was the eighteenth Mickey Mouse short to be produced, the third of that year.

The cartoon's cast includes Mickey, Minnie Mouse as a cantina waitress, Peg-Leg Pete as the villain Peg-Leg Pedro, and Horace Horsecollar as Mickey's horse.

This short features a number of notable firsts and lasts: it is the first short with Marcellite Garner as the voice of Minnie Mouse; it is also the first time in a Mickey Mouse cartoon that Pete has a peg-leg. It is also the last short directed by Walt Disney for the next five years.

Plot
Mickey rides his horse up to a Mexican cantina, where he finds Minnie working as a waitress. He dances and plays the spoons to amuse her, but when he cheekily tweaks her nose, she becomes enraged, upbraiding him in Spanish and then pelting him with lamps and bottles. He earns her favor again by doing a silly dance and playing the piano. Peg-Leg Pete, an ugly ruffian, dances into the cantina and grabs Minnie's arm, taking some beer and asking her for a kiss. Mickey stands up to the bully, and they both draw their guns.

The lights go out, and Mickey and Pete engage in a spirited gunfight. Pete emerges from the cantina with his hands around Minnie; he jumps on his donkey, and rides away. Mickey tries to follow on his horse, but ends up dragged behind the animal, poked with cactus needles. Mickey finally catches up with Pete and jumps onto his moving donkey, then punches him in the face. Pete falls off a cliff and is squashed flat by a boulder. Mickey, Minnie and the horse wave goodbye to a two-dimensional Pete.

Production
This cartoon is the first to feature Marcellite Garner as the voice of Minnie Mouse. She says in Working with Walt: Interviews with Disney Artists:

Garner continued with the role until 1941, when she left the studio.

Peg-Leg Pete, who had been seen with two legs in 1928's Steamboat Willie and The Gallopin' Gaucho, is seen with a peg-leg here for the first time in a Mickey Mouse cartoon.  In this short, he takes the name Peg-Leg Pedro. Pete speaks for the first time in this cartoon.

Horace Horsecollar appears in this cartoon, wearing his characteristic bowler hat, but he's still acting like a horse, and hasn't reached his final anthropomorphized form. He'll become fully humanized in two cartoons' time, in The Shindig.

This is the last film directed by Walt Disney until his ill-judged return five years later with the Silly Symphony short The Golden Touch.

On The Cactus Kid, animators worked for the first time to match the action to a prerecorded soundtrack, which allowed for greater synchronization than in previous cartoons.

The short used music from España, rhapsody for orchestra by Emmanuel Chabrier, and the chase scene was scored to Jacques Offenbach's can-can.

Mickey and Horace's chase scene reuses some animation from Sagebrush Sadie, a 1928 Oswald the Lucky Rabbit cartoon.

Voice actors
 Mickey Mouse: Walt Disney
 Minnie Mouse: Marcellite Garner
 Peg-legged Pete: ???

Reception

According to Ryan Kilpatrick of The Disney Film Project, "The Cactus Kid is really just a remake of The Gallopin' Gaucho, but it has some distinct differences that make this short very memorable...  In Gaucho, Mickey is a swaggering bundle of bravado, who enters the cantina through the window, drinks a beer and smokes a cigarette. He's rough around the edges and grabs Minnie to dance, not asking permission. In Cactus Kid, however, Mickey enters through the door, after riding in on Horace Horsecollar. He meekly enters and joins Minnie in a song, not joining in the revelry with a drink or cigarette like last time. He plays music with her, and when he gets a little fresh, tweaking her nose, Minnie fires back, throwing plates at him. The old Mickey would have been more forceful, but this version of Mickey instead takes a couple of mugs that Minnie threw at him and uses them to do a Mexican dance, using the mugs as castanets. It's quite the change from the mouse who grabs the girl and forces a kiss like he did in Plane Crazy and Gallopin' Gaucho."

Variety (June 18, 1930) said: "For any house that wants to add novelty, comedy and a sure-fire audience-pleaser here's a pip rolled into six minutes. They don't get into the Paramount by mistake and Walt Disney and associates have combined pen and sound effects for beaucoup laughs."

The Film Daily (June 22, 1930) said: "Another of the first-grade cartoon comedies turned out by Walt Disney, and it's a pippin of the front rank. Sound effects are blended into the pen-and-ink creations in such a way that the result is sure-fire for laughs, to say nothing of the unique and unusual nature of the performance."

Motion Picture News (August 23, 1930) said: "Mickey is a cowboy in this and rides to a saloon to make love to a rodent senorita. The villain enters and there is considerable fun. It averages well with others of this popular series, and has a sufficient number of laughs to please most audiences."

Home media
The short was released on December 7, 2004 on Walt Disney Treasures: Mickey Mouse in Black and White, Volume Two: 1929-1935.

Television
The short was shown on several Disney Channel compilation shows. 
 Mickey's Mouse Tracks (Season 1, Episode 31)
 Donald's Quack Attack (Season 1, Episode 22)
 The Mickey Mouse Club (Season 1, Episode 39)

See also
Mickey Mouse (film series)

References

External links
 
 

Mickey Mouse short films
1930s Disney animated short films
1930 short films
American black-and-white films
1930 animated films
1930 films
Films produced by Walt Disney
Films set in Mexico
American comedy short films
Columbia Pictures short films
Columbia Pictures animated short films
1930s English-language films
1930s American films